Pythopolis may refer to:
Pythopolis (Mysia)
Pythopolis, alternate name of Antioch on the Maeander
Pythopolis, alternate name of Nysa on the Maeander